Stictoleptura fontenayi is a species of longhorn beetle in the 
Lepturinae subfamily, that can be found in African countries like Algeria, Morocco, Tunisia and European countries like France, Portugal and Spain.

Description
Both sexes are red, with black coloured head, legs, and antennae. The female prothorax is red, while males is black.

References

Stictoleptura
Beetles described in 1839
Beetles of North Africa
Beetles of Europe